Harold Joseph (born 15 July 1956) is a Trinidadian cricketer. He played in twenty-five first-class and seven List A matches for Trinidad and Tobago from 1974 to 1988.

See also
 List of Trinidadian representative cricketers

References

External links
 

1956 births
Living people
Trinidad and Tobago cricketers